was a Japanese television variety show and also a game show that airs on Fuji Television in Japan, starring the Japanese owarai duo Tunnels. It is the origin of the international Brain Wall television franchise, and the J-pop group Yaen.

Recurring segments

Pit drops
The premise of the dokkiri segment is unsuspecting victims on a golf course falling into large hidden traps, which then in turn is scored as a golf game by Takaaki Ishibashi's host "AO-Ki" (a play on Isao Aoki's name) based on how spectacular the fall was. Starting with the fourth season, the golf setting was exchanged to waterfronts, with the goal being getting the targets into the water.

External links
 
 

1990s Japanese television series
2000s Japanese television series
2010s Japanese television series
1997 Japanese television series debuts
2018 Japanese television series endings
Japanese game shows
Japanese-language television shows
Japanese variety television shows
Fuji TV original programming